Bessie Dorrington Bangay (29 June 1889 – 25 March 1987) was an English church worker. At the time of her death, she was the last of the original cohort of Bishop's messengers in the Church of England, licensed during World War I.

Early life 
Bangay was born in 1889 in Lyme Regis, Dorset, the daughter of Richard Bangay and Agnes Dorrington Bangay. She had a twin sister, Evelyn, known as Evie, and four older siblings.  Her parents were from Norfolk; her father was a doctor and a socialist, who gave popular science lectures and built an observatory on his property.

Career 
Bangay and her twin sister moved to Chesham, Buckinghamshire in 1910, and Bessie started to teach Sunday school at St George's Church, Tyler's Hill, Ley Hill. In 1917, during a wartime shortage of male church leaders, she was licensed by the Bishop of Oxford, as one of 22 women who began the Diocesan Order of Women's Messengers, female lay readers in the Church of England. She led St George's Church during the war, and afterwards. She took charge of the Sunday school when it resumed in 1919, and set up a ladies' cricket team, as well as groups for girls, young wives, mothers, and senior citizens. She was also in charge of the church's annual Nativity play. She also began a branch congregation at a pub in nearby Lye Green in the 1930s, and continued to run the "pub church" until 1963.

Bangay founded the Ley Hill Women's Institute, and was a member of the Chiltern Arts Society.  She attended the National School for Religious Drama in 1955.

Personal life 
Bangay and her sister lived together most of their lives, and were enthusiastic gardeners. They raised prize-winning poultry and enjoyed bicycling. Bessie Bangay died in 1987, aged 97 years, and was the long-serving and last remaining of the original Bishop's Messengers in England. Her grave is in St George's churchyard; Evie Bangay died within the year, and is buried with Bessie. There is a church window commemorating Bessie Bangay's long tenure of leadership. The sisters left money to the church, used to establish meeting space known as "the Bangay Rooms".

References

External links 

 
Sheila Hart and Neil Rees, The Church by the Woods (Latimer & Ley Hill Parish Council), a church history booklet, based in part on Bessie Bangay's memoirs.

1889 births
1987 deaths
English twins
Anglican lay readers
British women in World War I
People from Lyme Regis